Paisley-Rice Log House is a historic home located near Mebane, Orange County, North Carolina.  It believed to date to the late-18th century.  The log dwelling is composed of two sections and follows the three-room Quaker plan, or Continental Plan.  Located between the two sections is a chimney. The interior features vernacular Georgian woodwork.

It was listed on the National Register of Historic Places in 1979.

References

Log houses in the United States
Houses on the National Register of Historic Places in North Carolina
Georgian architecture in North Carolina
Houses in Orange County, North Carolina
National Register of Historic Places in Orange County, North Carolina
Log buildings and structures on the National Register of Historic Places in North Carolina